Vitosha Metro Station is a station on the Sofia Metro in Bulgaria, named after Vitosha mountain. It opened on 20 July 2016.

Interchange with other public transport
 Tramway service: 10
 Bus service: 64, 65, 66, 83, 88, 93, 98, 120, 122

Location
The station is located in Hladilnika district, just next to Paradise Center, the largest shopping mall in Bulgaria, to which it is connected by an underpass. Hladilnika bus station, located nearby, serves several suburban bus lines to Vitosha mountain.

Architecture
The interest of mountaineers in the station determines its design, which is entirely inspired by the mountain and creates the feeling of a celebration of nature. Travelers on the platform fall in minutes among the hills of the mountain through the three-dimensional effect achieved by combining natural stone in warm gray and granite slabs in two shades of green - bolder and brighter for close-ups and darker and muted for distant. Colorful meadows in the pavement are formed with basalt flower mosaic.

The materials of the station are a combination of natural and artificial stone. The floors of the two lobbies and the platform are made of colored granite and granitogres. The walls are a combination of granite, granitogres and mineral plaster. The ceiling is made of "etalbond" composite material and colored mineral plaster. The stairs are made entirely of granite steps and the railings are made of stainless steel. Impressive lighting fixtures adorn the platform.

Gallery

References

External links

 Sofia Metropolitan
 More info in Bulgarian
 SofiaMetro@UrbanRail
 Sofia Urban Mobility Center
 Sofia Metropolitan

Sofia Metro stations
Railway stations opened in 2016
2016 establishments in Bulgaria